The 2014 Women's Hockey Champions Trophy was the 21st edition of the Hockey Champions Trophy for women. It was held from 29 November to 7 December 2014 in Mendoza, Argentina. From this year on the tournament began to be held biennially due to the introduction of the Hockey World League, returning to its original format changed in 1999.

Argentina won the tournament for the sixth time after defeating Australia 3–1 in the final on a penalty shoot-out after a 1–1 draw, tying the record of six titles previously set by Australia and the Netherlands in 2003 and 2011 respectively. The Netherlands won the third place match by defeating New Zealand 2–1.

Qualification
Alongside as the host nation, the top five finishers from the previous edition and the winner of the 2012 Champions Challenge I qualified automatically. The remaining spots were nominated by the FIH Executive Board, making a total of 8 competing teams. If one of the teams refused to play, that place would be awarded to the next best finisher in the previous tournament, the same applies to the teams nominated by the Executive Board.

 (Host nation and defending champions)
 (Second in 2012 Champions Trophy as Great Britain)
 (Third in 2012 Champions Trophy)
 (Fourth in 2012 Champions Trophy)
 (Fifth in 2012 Champions Trophy)
 (Winner of 2012 Champions Challenge I)
 (Nominated by FIH Executive Board)
 (Nominated by FIH Executive Board)

Umpires
Below are the 10 umpires appointed by the International Hockey Federation:

Fanneke Alkemade (NED)
Kelly Hudson (NZL)
Stephanie Judefind (USA)
Mariana Reydo (ARG)
Lisa Roach (AUS)
Annelize Rostron (RSA)
Mercedes Sánchez (ARG)
Kylie Seymour (AUS)
Chieko Soma (JPN)
Sarah Wilson (SCO)

Results
All times are Argentina Time (UTC−03:00)

First round

Pool A

Pool B

Second round

Quarter-finals

Fifth to eighth place classification

Crossover

Seventh and eighth place

Fifth and sixth place

First to fourth place classification

Semi-finals

Third and fourth place

Final

Awards

Statistics

Final standings

Goalscorers

References

External links
Official website

2014
2014 in women's field hockey
hockey
International women's field hockey competitions hosted by Argentina
Sport in Mendoza, Argentina
November 2014 sports events in South America
December 2014 sports events in South America